Marthinus du Plessis (born 2 June 1932) is a South African modern pentathlete. He competed at the 1956 Summer Olympics.

References

1932 births
Living people
South African male modern pentathletes
Olympic modern pentathletes of South Africa
Modern pentathletes at the 1956 Summer Olympics